Ferenc Machos (30 June 1932 - 3 December 2006) was a Hungarian football forward who played for Hungary in the 1954 FIFA World Cup. He also played for Budapest Honvéd FC.

References

External links
 

1932 births
2006 deaths
Hungarian footballers
Hungary international footballers
Association football forwards
Budapest Honvéd FC players
Vasas SC players
1954 FIFA World Cup players
People from Tatabánya
Nemzeti Bajnokság I managers
Sportspeople from Komárom-Esztergom County